Elnur Jafarov (born 28 March 1997) is an Azerbaijani football player who plays for Qaradağ Lökbatan FK as a forward.

Career

Club
On 28 July 2018, Jafarov signed a one-year contract with Keşla, but left the club by mutual consent on 28 December 2018. He also played for C.D. Tondela in 2016  which transfer was announced on Jul 6, 2016 via official Twitter page of CD Tondela.

International
On 13 October 2015 Jafarov made his senior international debut for Azerbaijan game against Bulgaria.

Career statistics

International

Statistics accurate as of match played 17 November 2015

Honours

Club
Khazar Lankaran
 Azerbaijan Supercup (1): 2013

International
Azerbaijan U23
 Islamic Solidarity Games: (1) 2017

References

External links
 

1997 births
Living people
People from Lankaran
Azerbaijani footballers
Azerbaijan international footballers
Azerbaijan under-21 international footballers
Azerbaijan youth international footballers
Azerbaijani expatriate footballers
Azerbaijan Premier League players
First Football League (Croatia) players
Khazar Lankaran FK players
NK Dugopolje players
Neftçi PFK players
Shamakhi FK players
Sumgayit FK players
Expatriate footballers in Croatia
Association football forwards